Academia is a school in Dhaka with multiple campuses in the city. It has campuses in Lalmatia, Dhanmondi, Mirpur, Gulshan, and Uttara. It was established in 2002. The primary language of instruction is English. It offers classes from Playgroup to A-Levels (12). The school follows both Cambridge Assessment International Education (CAIE) & Edexcel Curriculum.

References

External links
 

Schools in Dhaka
2002 establishments in Bangladesh
Educational institutions established in 2002